Michele Placido (born 19 May 1946) is an Italian actor, film director, and screenwriter. He began his career on stage, and first gained mainstream attention through a series of roles in films directed by the likes of Mario Monicelli and Marco Bellocchio, winning the Berlinale's Silver Bear for Best Actor for his performance in the 1979 film Ernesto. He is known internationally for portraying police inspector Corrado Cattani on the crime drama television series La piovra (1984–2001). Placido's directorial debut, Pummarò, was screened Un Certain Regard at the 1990 Cannes Film Festival. Three of his films have competed for the Golden Lion at the Venice Film Festival. He is a five-time Nastro d'Argento and four-time David di Donatello winner. In 2021, Placido was appointed President of the Teatro Comunale in Ferrara.

Early life
Placido was born at Ascoli Satriano, into a poor family from Rionero in Vulture, Basilicata; he is a descendant of the known brigand Carmine Crocco. Placido had a number of jobs since his youth. For a time, he worked as a police officer in Rome, and was involved in the Battle of Valle Giulia. He studied acting at the Centro Sperimentale di Cinematografia in Rome, and with Silvio D'Amico at the Accademia Nazionale di Arte Drammatica.

Career 
Placido made his debut as an actor in the play Midsummer Night's Dream in 1969. Two years later he started film work under directors such as Luigi Comencini, Mario Monicelli, Salvatore Samperi, Damiano Damiani, Pasquale Squitieri, Francesco Rosi, Walerian Borowczyk, Marco Bellocchio, Paolo Cavara and Carlo Lizzani. His first success came with the role of soldier Paolo Passeri in Marcia trionfale (1976, directed by Bellocchio), for which he won a David di Donatello. Two years later he won the Silver Bear for Best Actor award at the 29th Berlin International Film Festival for his role of the homosexual worker in ironical melodrama Ernesto (1978, by Samperi).

He appeared in several TV movies in the 1970s, but 1983 marked the beginning of his greatest television popularity when he played the lead as a police inspector investigating the Mafia in Damiano Damiani's TV series La piovra. He went on to play the same part in the subsequent three series, until his character's assassination. Afterwards he would appear as a law enforcement official in a number of other films and TV productions dealing with organized crime, including a semi-biographical movie about Giovanni Falcone, where he acted as the titular judge. In 2008, in a reversal of roles, he portrayed longtime Mafia boss Bernardo Provenzano in the TV movie L'ultimo padrino.  A recognizable role to US audiences is that of an Italian businessman in the 1988 comedy Big Business.

Personal life 
Until a divorce in 1994, he was married to actress Simonetta Stefanelli. Their daughter Violante Placido is also an actress. 

In 2012, he married actress Federica Vincenti (born 8 November 1983) after over 10 years of dating. The couple divorced in December 2017.

He supported the candidacy for mayor of Rome of the italian entrepreneur Alfio Marchini in the 2016 Italian local elections. His nephew, Alessandro Onorato, is the Councilor for Major Events, Sport and Tourism for Rome.

Filmography

Actor 

 Il caso Pisciotta (1972, Eriprando Visconti) .... Amerigo Lo Jacono
 Mia moglie, un corpo per l'amore (1973, Mario Imperoli) .... Partner di Simona al night
 The Black Hand (The Birth of the Mafia) (1973, Antonio Racioppi) .... Antonio Turris
 Non ho tempo (1973) .... Studente
 Il Picciotto (1973, TV Movie, Alberto Negrin) .... Rosario Mandalà
 Teresa the Thief (1973, Carlo Di Palma) .... Tonino Santità
 Till Marriage Do Us Part (1974, Luigi Comencini) .... Silvano Pennacchini
 Come Home and Meet My Wife (1974, Mario Monicelli) .... Giovanni Pizzullo
 Orlando Furioso (1974, TV Mini-Series, Luca Ronconi) .... Agramante
 Processo per direttissima (1974, Lucio De Caro) .... Stefano Baldini
 Moses the Lawgiver (1974, TV Mini-Series, Gianfranco De Bosio) .... Caleb
 Scandal in the Family (1975, Bruno Gaburro) .... Milo
 The Divine Nymph (1975, Giuseppe Patroni Griffi) .... Martino Ghiondelli
 Marcia trionfale (1976, Marco Bellocchio) .... Paolo Passeri
 And Agnes Chose to Die (1976, Giuliano Montaldo) .... Tom
 La Orca (1976, Eriprando Visconti) .... Michele Turrisi
 Plot of Fear (1976, Paolo Cavara) .... Inspector Gaspare Lomenzo
 Oedipus Orca (1977, Eriprando Visconti) .... Michele Turrisi
 Kleinhoff Hotel (1977, Carlo Lizzani) .... Pedro
 Beach House (1977, Sergio Citti) .... Vincenzino
 The Pyjama Girl Case (1978, Flavio Mogherini) .... Antonio Attolini
 Io sono mia (1978, Sofia Scandurra) .... Giacinto 
 Corleone (1978, Pasquale Squitieri) .... Michele Labruzzo
 Ernesto (1979, Salvatore Samperi) .... The Man
 Tigers in Lipstick (1979, Luigi Zampa) .... Angelo / The Photographer
 A Man on His Knees (1979, Damiano Damiani) .... Antonio Platamonte
 The Meadow (1979, Paolo and Vittorio Taviani) .... Enzo
 Saturday, Sunday and Friday (1979, 3 directors) .... Mario Salvetti (segment "Domenica")
 A Leap in the Dark (1980, Marco Bellocchio) ... Giovanni Sciabola
 Lulu (1980, Walerian Borowczyk) .... Schwarz
 Fontamara (1980, Carlo Lizzani) .... Berardo Viola
 Three Brothers (1981, Francesco Rosi) .... Nicola Giuranna
 The Wings of the Dove (1981, Benoît Jacquot) .... Sandro
 Cargo (1981, Serge Dubor) .... Giovanni
 Sciopèn (1982, Luciano Odorisio) .... Francesco Maria Vitale
 Ars amandi (1983, Walerian Borowczyk) .... Macarius
 Les Amants terribles (1984, Danièle Dubroux and Stavros Kaplanidis) .... Sergio
 La piovra (1984, TV Mini-Series, Damiano Damiani) .... Commissario Corrado Cattani
 La piovra,  (1985, TV Mini-Series, Florestano Vancini) .... Commissario Corrado Cattani
 Pizza Connection (1985, Damiano Damiani) .... Mario Aloia
 Summer Night (1986, Lina Wertmüller) .... Beppe Catanìa
 Grandi magazzini (1986, Castellano & Pipolo) .... Director
 La piovra,  (1987, TV TV Mini-Series, Luigi Perelli) .... Commissario Corrado Cattani
 Come sono buoni i bianchi (1988, Marco Ferreri) .... Michele
 Private Affairs (1988, Francesco Massaro) .... Lionello Martini
 Big Business (1988, Jim Abrahams) .... Fabio Alberici
 Via Paradiso (1988, Luciano Odorisio) .... Francesco
 La piovra,  (1989, TV Mini-Series, Luigi Perelli) ... Commissario Corrado Cattani
 Mery per sempre (1989, Marco Risi) .... Marco Terzi
 Afganskiy izlom (1991, Vladimir Bortko) .... Major Bandura
 Drug Wars: The Cocaine Cartel (1992, TV miniseries, Paul Krasny) .... Col. Roberto Chavez
 Scoop (1992, TV TV Mini-Series, José María Sánchez) .... Marco Bonilli
 Close Friends (1992, Michele Placido) .... father of Simona
 Uomo di rispetto (1992, TV Movie, Damiano Damiani) .... Nino
 Quattro bravi ragazzi (1993, Claudio Camarca) .... Marcione
 Giovanni Falcone (1993) .... Giovanni Falcone
 Father and Son (1994, Pasquale Pozzessere) .... Corrado
 Lamerica (1994, Gianni Amelio) .... Fiore
 Policemen (1994, Giulio Base) .... Sante Carella
 Un eroe borghese (1995, Michele Placido) .... Silvio Novembre
 La Lupa (1996, Gabriele Lavia) .... Malerba
 Racket (1997, TV Mini-Series, Luigi Perelli) .... Guido Gerosa
 La Missione (1998, TV Movie, Maurizio Zaccaro) .... Padre Ramboni
  (1998, Nicolas Boukhrief) .... Carlo
 Of Lost Love (1998, Michele Placido) .... Don Gerardo
 Dirty Linen (1999, Mario Monicelli) .... Furio Cimin
 The Nanny (1999, Marco Bellocchio) .... Belli Estate Patient
 A Respectable Man (1999, Maurizio Zaccaro) .... Enzo Tortora
 Terra bruciata (1999, Fabio Segatori) .... Fra' Salvatore
 Free the Fish (2000) .... Michele Verrio
 Padre Pio - Tra cielo e terra (2000, TV Movie) .... Padre Pio da Pietralcina
 Tra due mondi (2001) .... Uzeda
 Il Sequestro Soffiantini (2002, TV Movie) .... Giuseppe Soffiantini
 Searching for Paradise (2002) .... Giorgio Mattei
 Mario Monicelli, l'artigiano di Viareggio (2002) .... Himself
 Il posto dell'anima (2003) .... Salvatore
  (2003, TV Movie) .... Enrico Mattei
 Un papà quasi perfetto (2003, TV Mini-Series) .... Michele Salvi
 Love Returns (2004) .... Dottor Bianco
 The Smell of Blood (2004) .... Carlo
 Caterina in the Big City (2003) .... Himself (Special Guest)
 Il Grande Torino (2005, TV Movie) .... Angelo, 2004
 Estrenando sueños (2005) .... Padre Freddo
 Liolà (2005)
 The Goodbye Kiss (2006) .... Anedda
 The Caiman (2006) .... Marco Pulici / Silvio Berlusconi
 Karol: The Pope, The Man (2006, TV Movie) .... Dr. Renato Buzzonetti
 The Unknown Woman (2006) .... Muffa
 The Roses of the Desert (2006) .... Frate Simeone
 Commediasexi (2006) .... Salvatore Lisassi
 SoloMetro (2007) .... Enrico Alvari
 Piano, solo (2007) .... Giovanni
 2061: An Exceptional Year (2007) .... Cardinale Bonifacio Colonna
 L'ultimo padrino (2008, TV Movie) .... Bernardo Provenzano
 The Sorrow of Mrs. Schneider (2008) .... Count Sternberk
 La luna nel deserto (2008, short) .... Leone (voice)
 Aldo Moro - Il presidente (2008, TV Movie) .... Aldo Moro
 Blood of the Losers (2008) .... Commissario Franco Dogliani
 Focaccia blues (2009) .... Proiezionista
 Baarìa (2009) .... Communist
 The Big Dream (2009) .... Andrea
 Oggi sposi (2009) .... Sabino Impanato
 Parents and Children: Shake Well Before Using (2010) .... Alberto
 Manuale d'amore 3 (2011) .... Augusto
 Amici miei – Come tutto ebbe inizio (2011) .... Duccio Villani di Masi
 Tulpa (2012) .... Roccaforte
 The Lookout (2012) .... Giovanni
 Viva l'Italia (2012) .... Michele Spagnolo
 Razza bastarda (2012) .... Avv.Silvestri
 Itaker - Vietato agli italiani (2012) .... Pantano'
 Living Legends (2014) .... Christiano Negri
 The Choice (2015) .... Emilio Nicotri
 Io che amo solo te (2015) .... Domenico Scagliusi aka don Mimì
 Un'avventura romantica (2016) .... Vittorio De Sica
 7 Minutes (2016) .... Michele Varazzi - il proprietario della fabbrica
 La cena di Natale (2016) .... Don Mimì
 Lectura Ovidii (2019) .... Himself
I Hate Summer (2020)

Director

 Pummarò (1990)
 Close Friends (1992)
 Un eroe borghese (1995)
 Of Lost Love (1998)
 Un Altro mondo è possibile (2001)
 A Journey Called Love (2002)
 Ovunque sei (2004)
 Romanzo criminale (2005)
 The Big Dream (2009)
 L'Aquila 2009 - Cinque registi tra le macerie (2009)
 Vallanzasca - Gli angeli del male (2010)
 Le Guetteur (2012)
 The Choice (2015)
 7 Minutes (2016)

References

External links

 

1946 births
Living people
20th-century Italian male actors
21st-century Italian male actors
Italian male film actors
Italian film directors
Italian screenwriters
Italian male screenwriters
People of Lucanian descent
People from the Province of Foggia
Accademia Nazionale di Arte Drammatica Silvio D'Amico alumni
Centro Sperimentale di Cinematografia alumni
David di Donatello winners
Nastro d'Argento winners
Ciak d'oro winners
Silver Bear for Best Actor winners
Italian stage actors